The  is an ancient legal injunction of restraint employed by a person who believes they are being wronged by another at that moment.  It survives as a fully enforceable law to this day in the legal systems of Jersey and Guernsey, and is used, albeit infrequently, for matters affecting land.

History
The  was used by landowner Asselin FitzArthur to object to the burial of William the Conqueror. According to Asselin, the church where the king was to be buried was built on land unlawfully seized from his family.

Procedure
The procedure is performed on one's knees before at least two witnesses, in the presence of the wrong-doer, and in the location of the offence. The  with his hand in the air must call out —

Following this, the  must recite the Lord's Prayer in French.

On hearing this, the alleged wrong-doer must cease his challenged activities until the matter is adjudicated in court. Failure to stop will lead to the imposition of a fine, regardless of which party is in the right.

The  in Guernsey requires that a grace be said after the Lord's Prayer:

Furthermore, the grievance must be put in writing and lodged at the  within 24 hours.

Limitations
 can be overruled. For instance, in 1778 the States of Guernsey decided to erect 15 loophole towers at various points on the coast to impede any French incursion on the island. Although most of the towers were built on the commons, or on public land above the high-water mark, three towers were to be built on private land. The States were of the opinion that the project was of such importance that if necessary they would exercise eminent domain, "notwithstanding any  or any opposition whatsoever".

A  can also be denied by a court.

Recent uses
The  was raised in Guernsey in December 2016 to block the forcible removal of a derelict Kia Sportage from private land.

The court refused to register her clameur, because she does not own the land in question.

In 2021, it was used in Jersey as an attempt to prevent an eviction. The  was ruled as having been raised incorrectly in court on the grounds that the person raising it had lost legal title to the property and it could not be used to block court officials carrying out a court order.

See also
 Hue and cry

Notes

References
 
 
 Holden, Richard, Jersey Law Course: Civil Procedure (Institute of Law, Jersey, 2011), chapter 23.

External links
Jersey Legal Information Board
Jersey Citizens Advice Bureau
Criants, Clamerists and the Clameur de Haro in the Channel Islands

Jersey law
Bailiwick of Guernsey
Normandy
Judicial remedies